Ryan Joseph Newman (born December 8, 1977), nicknamed "Rocket Man", is an American professional stock car racing driver. He currently competes full time in the SRX Camping World Series driving the No. 39. He last competed full-time in the NASCAR Cup Series, driving the No. 6 Ford Mustang for Roush Fenway Racing, as well as part-time in the NASCAR Camping World Truck Series, driving the No. 39 Ford F-150 for DCC Racing.

Newman made his racing debut in 1993 in the United Midget Auto Racing Association and the All-American Midget Series, winning both Rookie of the Year and the championship. His 100 feature wins and two titles have him in the Quarter Midget Hall of Fame. Moving to USAC in 1995 running the C.E. Lewis No. 39 Drinan Chassis powered Brayton Motor, he was ROTY again in both the Midget Series and the Silver Crown in 1996. In 1999, he was the first driver to win in all three divisions while being the Silver Bullet Series champion in the No. 14 Beast Chassis powered Chevy.

NASCAR

Cup Series

Penske Racing (2000–2008)
Newman began driving for racing icon Roger Penske in 2000, in order to transition to stock car racing. Newman ran the No. 27 Alltel-sponsored Ford for Penske Racing in the ARCA RE/MAX Series. Newman won three of the five ARCA races he entered, and made his Winston Cup debut at Phoenix International Raceway in the No. 02 Alltel-sponsored Ford for Penske. In 2001, Penske planned for Newman to run at least 23 combined events in both ARCA and NASCAR, while Newman attended Purdue University. In addition to five ARCA events, Newman ran 15 Busch Series races that season, winning poles in his second and third career starts and scoring his first career win at Michigan International Speedway in just his 9th career start. He also had a series-high six poles. Around this time he would meet racing legend Buddy Baker, who would eventually become his mentor on superspeedways.

In 2002, Newman won a season-high six poles, breaking the rookie record set by Davey Allison. Newman joined Dale Earnhardt Jr. as the second rookie to win The Winston all-star race. At Watkins Glen later that summer, Newman led 11 laps and finished second behind Tony Stewart. However the race ended in controversy as it was discovered that Stewart had restarted the race too early and jumped the restart. Despite a protest by Penske, NASCAR upheld Stewart's win. In September, he scored his first career Winston Cup win at New Hampshire Motor Speedway after starting from the pole. Newman beat out Jimmie Johnson for the Rookie of the Year award on the strength of rookie records in top-fives (14) and top-tens (22), even though Johnson had more wins, finished higher in the points standings, and led the standings at one point.

Newman's sophomore season began with a flip at the 2003 Daytona 500 after contact with Ken Schrader and Bobby Labonte. At Watkins Glen, he spun and hit the foam blocks, sending him on his side. The near-flip was at the 2003 Aaron's 499, when he blew a tire mid-pack and nearly turned on his side in turn 1, sparking a 27-car crash. Newman's 2003 season was pretty inconsistent. He would win one race but wreck in the next. Though finishing the season with a series-high eight wins and eleven poles along with 17 top-fives and 22 top-tens and an average finish of 13.9, Newman also suffered seven DNF's, which left him sixth in points. His number of poles during the season led to him being nicknamed "Rocket Man".

In 2004, Newman qualified for the inaugural Chase for the Cup by finishing seventh in points with two wins and nine poles. He made the 2005 Chase as well, while returning to the Busch Series after a four-year absence, winning six out of the nine races he entered, including a series-record five straight.

Newman endured his first winless season in 2006, finishing a career-worst 18th in points, while his longtime crew chief, Matt Borland, left for Michael Waltrip Racing. His pole ratio between his rookie year and 2006 was one in every three races, tying him for fifteenth on the all-time poles list. As of November 2020, Ryan has 51 poles, placing him 9th all-time.

In 2007, despite a streak of three consecutive poles, Newman again failed to win a race, including a near win at Lowe's Motor Speedway that was spoiled by a blown tire. His winless drought ended after he won the 2008 Daytona 500 on February 17, 2008. It was also the first Daytona 500 win for Penske. Newman Failed To Make The Chase From 2006-2008. In The Points Standings He Finished 18th In 2006, 13th In 2007, And 17th In 2008.

Stewart-Haas Racing (2009–2013)

On July 15, 2008, Newman announced that he was leaving Penske at the end of the season, and a month later, it was confirmed he was joining Haas CNC Racing for 2009, in the No. 4 Chevy Impala, the number was later changed to 39 due to Morgan–McClure Motorsports owning the number. The team was renamed Stewart-Haas Racing before the season.

Despite a slow start, Newman earned a pole, five top 5s, and 15 top 10s, and an average finish of 14.0, his best since his 8-win season in 2003. On September 12 at Richmond, Newman finished 10th and clinched a spot in the Chase for the first time since 2005. On November 1, 2009, at the Amp Energy 500 at Talladega Superspeedway, Newman was involved in a heavy crash on the back stretch in which he flipped over on top of Kevin Harvick entering Turn 3. He ended up on his roof and because the roof was crushed, crews had to use the Jaws of Life to pry the roof off the car after NASCAR officials flipped it back over. Newman was unharmed.

On April 10, 2010, Newman broke a 78-race winless streak with a win in the Subway Fresh Fit 600 at Phoenix International Raceway.  He only led 4 laps during the race. The win was the first in NASCAR history for a car numbered 39. In September 2010, he was chosen as "honorable mention" in a list of the smartest athletes in sports by Sporting News.

Newman began his 2011 season by leading the most laps in the Daytona 500, but crashed twice late and finished 22nd. He got his first win of the season winning on a fuel mileage having enough to get the checkered flag at the Lenox Industrial Tools 301 at New Hampshire, giving him his 3rd career win at the track. Tony Stewart finished 2nd, giving Stewart/Haas Racings their first ever 1–2 finish. At the same track in September, Newman grabbed his 3rd pole of the season at the Sylvania 300. The 49th pole of his career put him in a tie for 10th all time on career poles with Bobby Isaac.

On April 1, 2012, at Martinsville Speedway, Newman survived a wild finish to get the 16th win of his career, driving the #39 Outback Steakhouse car. The finish involved a controversial caution with 3 laps to go involving the No. 10 of David Reutimann which set up a green-white-checkered finish. Jeff Gordon and Jimmie Johnson dominated but on the restart, they crashed with Clint Bowyer and Newman came through unscathed en route to the win.

Newman's 2013 campaign started with a 5th-place finish in the Daytona 500, but his momentum changed with two crashes at Phoenix the following week. He finished 38th at Las Vegas, but recovered with a 7th-place finish at Bristol. Newman collected two more Top 10 finishes in the next three races, but during that span he also had a controversial 31st-place finish in Martinsville. After a puncture, Newman appeared to stop deliberately and was penalized three laps. Two mediocre races at Kansas and Richmond followed, before the series went to Talladega. There, Newman was initially running well but finished 32nd when he and his teammate Danica Patrick were caught up in a spectacular late crash that saw Kurt Busch flip over and land on top of Newman. Newman, however, recovered well to collect two consecutive Top 10 finishes at both Darlington and Charlotte, displaying a large performance difference between the All-Star Race and the Coca-Cola 600.

At Dover, Newman was running well until a pit road accident. There, he nearly tapped Jimmie Johnson after locking up his wheels when coming into pit road. He was penalized for a speeding violation resulting from the locked wheels and was one lap down after the penalty. Not long after the penalty, Newman was involved in an accident with David Gilliland, ending his race.

The following week at Pocono Raceway, Newman led 19 laps and finished 5th, after running most of the race on an off-sequence pit stop strategy.

Newman strung together three unimpressive races at Michigan, Kentucky, and Sonoma, before finishing 10th at Daytona after a crash at the finish line. This made him, Jimmie Johnson and Dale Earnhardt Jr. the only three drivers to sweep the Top 10 at Daytona in 2013 (with only Johnson sweeping the Top 5 by winning both).

At New Hampshire, Newman finished 39th in the Camping World RV Sales 301 after a crash with Kurt Busch, giving Newman his 5th DNF of 2013. On July 27, Newman won the pole for the Brickyard 400. The race was mainly a duel between Newman and Jimmie Johnson. On the final set of pit stops, Newman capitalized on a mistake by Johnson's pit crew and held on to the lead to win the race. It was Newman's first victory since the 2012 Goody's Fast Relief 500. Newman was leading near the finish of the Richmond race when Clint Bowyer spun with seven laps to go. Newman pitted, and ended up falling behind Carl Edwards, Kurt Busch and Paul Menard on the restart. He got past Menard, but could not catch Busch or Edwards on the last three laps, and lost the tiebreaker for the runner-up Wildcard spot with Martin Truex Jr.

On September 9, 2013, it was announced that Newman would replace Truex in the Chase after an investigation into Bowyer's spin proved that Bowyer had spun himself out intentionally to give Truex an opportunity to hold off Newman for the spot, under which Truex would have clinched a tiebreaker over Newman.

Richard Childress Racing (2014–2018)
On July 12, 2013, it was announced that Kevin Harvick would be joining Stewart-Haas Racing, driving the No. 4 Chevrolet SS, and that Newman would depart from the team at season's end, due to the team having no funding to run a four-car team.

On September 9, 2013, it was announced that Newman would be moving to Richard Childress Racing for the 2014 NASCAR Sprint Cup Series season, replacing Jeff Burton in the No. 31 Chevrolet.

Newman's first highlight of the year was at The Profit on CNBC 500 Phoenix Spring race. During the Cup series event, Newman controlled the race with less than 50 laps to go battling Kyle Busch for the lead for several laps. An untimely caution came out with less than 40 to go. Having not pitted in over 60 laps, Newman and Busch were forced to pit during the caution. As a result, Newman and Busch lost their shot at the win.

At Michigan in August, Newman questioned a move that Jimmie Johnson pulled on him in the final five laps of the Pure Michigan 400. He and Jimmie exchanged heated words after the race. Newman refused to comment and when asked what Newman had to say, Johnson replied "Typical Ryan Newman stuff."

Because of consistency throughout the season, Newman beat veteran Jeff Gordon for the final wildcard spot in the 2014 Chase for the Sprint Cup. Newman almost won at Talladega when he controlled the final 10 laps. However, a final Green-White-Checkered finish attempt relegated Newman to a fifth-place finish. Although his car failed post-race inspection, NASCAR gave no penalties because of damage received during the Talladega race.

Newman was so consistent that after starting the Chase 11th in the standings, he moved up each round and was fourth when they came to Phoenix for the next-to-last round of the Chase.

At Phoenix, Newman was in danger of missing the final round. On the final lap, Newman pulled a controversial move on Kyle Larson, forcing Larson to slap the wall. Newman finishing 11th bumped Jeff Gordon out of the Chase. Newman defended his move stating that while it was unintentional, he felt like he owed Larson one for a previous accident. Larson later himself agreed with Newman's situation but admitted to have been initially furious over the move.

At Homestead, Newman almost won the Championship but because he finished second to Kevin Harvick in the race, he finished second to Harvick in the standings. When Newman was interviewed he stated that he was not going to play dirty and wanted to have a clean race with Harvick. Ryan Newman was in position to win the race with a two-tire call prior to the final caution. Jeff Gordon pit which allowed Harvick to gain one row for the upcoming restart for the championship. 

Newman announced in January 2015 that he renewed his Richard Childress Racing contract and would drive the No. 31 again for the 2015 NASCAR Cup series season. Though Newman did not win a pole in 2014 he was listed as being among the drivers allowed in the Sprint Unlimited because NASCAR allowed all Chase drivers to participate in the race.

Newman began his season with a string of Top 10s, including a third-place finish at Las Vegas. While running sixth in the standings in late-March, NASCAR confiscated various tires from Newman's team following the 2015 Auto Club 400 suspecting that Newman's team illegally tampered with the tires. Many teams including Newman's were accused of poking holes in the tires to allow air to bleed, which produces more grip for the tires and allows a car to maintain faster speed. Two weeks later NASCAR penalized Newman's team with a 75-point deduction, a $125,000 fine, a six-race suspension for crew chief Luke Lambert and two key crew members. Richard Childress Racing announced that they would appeal the penalties. Both appeals were exhausted with the same outcome, when the Final Appeals officer upheld the partially reduced penalties including the suspensions.  The only reason the penalties were partially reduced was because of a gray area in the NASCAR rulebook over whether or not the penalties were post-race inspection penalties.

Newman went on to make the Chase, but was eliminated at the end of round 2. He went on to finish 11th in the final standings, one point short of the Top 10. Jimmie Johnson beat him out for 10th by one point.

On October 10, 2016, Newman signed a multi-year extension with Richard Childress Racing to return in 2017. This extension was rewarded with Newman's and Childress's first victory in four years with his triumph in the Camping World 500 at Phoenix International Raceway. The race was dominated by Kyle Busch, but a late caution caused by Joey Logano blowing a tire with five laps to go set up a final restart. Newman elected to stay out and held off Kyle Larson to claim the win. The win marked Newman's 18th and RCR's 106th Cup victory, ending 127- and 112-race winless streaks, respectively. This was also the first win for the No. 31 car since Jeff Burton won at Lowe's Motor Speedway in 2008. Newman was eliminated in the first round, after finishing only 2 points behind Ricky Stenhouse Jr.

On September 15, 2018, it was announced that Newman will not return to Richard Childress Racing in 2019. Newman barely missed the Playoffs since 2016 and wound up 17th in the final standings despite also concluding his first full-time season with zero top-five finishes for the first time in his career.

Roush Fenway Racing (2019–2021)

On September 22, 2018, it was announced that Newman would drive the No. 6 Ford Mustang GT full-time for Roush Fenway Racing starting in 2019. At the conclusion of the 2019 Monster Energy NASCAR All-Star Race, Clint Bowyer chopped Newman's nose which sent Bowyer into the wall during the cool-down lap. Following the race, Bowyer attacked Newman on pit road. Both drivers were called to the NASCAR hauler, but neither was penalized for the incident. During an autograph session at a Bass Pro Shops store on May 23, a fan brought a pair of boxing gloves for both drivers to sign. Despite not winning a race, Newman stayed consistent enough to make the 2019 playoffs. He was eliminated in the Round of 16 after multiple incidents resulted in him finishing 32nd at the Charlotte Roval. He finished 15th in the final points standings with his best finish of 2nd coming at Talladega in October after losing the lead to Ryan Blaney in a photo-finish by .007 seconds, the 6th closest finish in NASCAR history.

On February 17, 2020, when leading on the final corner of the final lap of the 2020 Daytona 500, Newman's car was tapped in the rear by Ryan Blaney who was running second. Newman's car veered across the track and bounced off the outside wall, rolling over onto its roof and turning the driver's side toward Corey LaJoie's onrushing car. The violent collision caused Newman's car to roll over again and it slid upside down in a shower of sparks and flames across the finish line in ninth position, coming to a stop hundreds of yards away from the impact. LaJoie's car suffered hood damage and caught fire, but he appeared unhurt. It took nearly 15 minutes to extract Newman from the wreck and put him in an ambulance before he was taken to Halifax Medical Center. He sustained serious but non life-threatening injuries. Over the next two days, RFR provided updates on Newman's recovery, culminating in his release from the hospital on February 19, walking unaided. Ross Chastain replaced Newman in the No. 6 starting with the Pennzoil 400 at Las Vegas. On February 23, a statement was released detailing Newman's status, revealing that he suffered no broken bones but was recovering from an unspecified head injury. There was no timetable for Newman's return to resume his seat upon his hospital release, subject to his rehabilitation. Three weeks after the crash, Newman made an appearance at the Phoenix race, stating he believed his survival was a miracle having looked at the state of the wreck afterwards. Newman would later hold an interview with Today on March 11 where he discussed the crash, revealing he was knocked out and sustained a bruised brain. When asked about returning to racing, he stated "as soon as I possibly can".

Newman announced on April 26 that he would return to the driver's seat at the restart of NASCAR's 2020 season, as early as May 17. On April 27, 2020, it was announced that Newman was medically cleared to return to competition. In addition, NASCAR granted him a waiver for eligibility in the 2020 playoffs. However, he failed to make the playoffs after posting only two top-10 finishes, an 9th at the Daytona 500 and a 6th at the YellaWood 500.

Newman would return to Roush Fenway Racing in 2021. On July 20, RFR announced Brad Keselowski would take over the No. 6 as part of his new minority ownership in the organization, though the team has considered retaining Newman in a new part-time car. He finished a career-worst 28th in the final standings. He did not find a ride for 2022 in The Cup Series and decided to dirt race instead.

Nationwide Series
Newman made his Busch Series debut on February 24, 2001, at Rockingham in the Alltel 200.  He started second and finished ninth; it was his first of fifteen appearances in the 2001 season, where he finished with one win and eight Top 10 finishes.

He joined Dale Earnhardt Jr.'s JR Motorsports for the 2009 campaign as the driver of the No. 5 Chevy, signing on for four appearances for the year. In May 2010, Newman was hired to drive the No. 1 car for Phoenix Racing at Dover. In 2011, Newman drove the No. 30 Chevrolet for Turner Motorsports at Phoenix International Raceway.

Camping World Truck Series
Newman made his Truck Series debut on October 25, 2008 at Atlanta Motor Speedway, starting 10th in the 33 truck field driving Kevin Harvick's No. 2 Truck and passed his teammate Ron Hornaday Jr. with less than five laps to go to pick up his first truck series win in his first start making him the first driver to get their first Truck win at Atlanta and becoming the fourth driver to win in their first Truck race and joining the list of drivers who have won in all three of NASCAR's top series.

Newman made his Truck Series return on July 24, 2013 at the inaugural Mudsummer Classic at Eldora Speedway, and finished third.

In 2015, Newman made his return to the Truck Series at Kansas, replacing Joe Nemechek to drive the No. 8 Chevrolet Silverado where he finished 2nd.

On July 10, 2018, Jordan Anderson Racing announced that Newman would drive the No. 3 Chevrolet at Eldora. He would qualify 10th, but would fall 4 laps down, finishing in 30th.

On March 17, 2021, Newman revealed that he would be returning to the Truck Series and entering the new Bristol dirt race with a new team in the series, DCC Racing, owned by Brad Means. This team used the No. 39, Newman's number when he drove for Stewart-Haas Racing in the Cup Series, and was a Ford, the manufacturer Newman drives in the Cup Series with Roush Fenway Racing. Brad Means is the son of Jimmy Means, the team owner of Xfinity Series team Jimmy Means Racing. However, he failed to qualify when the heat races were canceled due to rain, his first ever DNQ in NASCAR.

Whelen Modified Tour
On April 1, 2022, Newman returned to the NASCAR Whelen Modified Tour, driving the SS Racing No. 39 at the 2022 Virginia is for Racing Lovers 150 at Richmond Raceway. He led a few laps early in the race, but faded to a 13th place finish.

Personal life
Newman was born December 8, 1977 in South Bend, Indiana. He graduated from Purdue University in 2001 with a B.S. in engineering. He has a sister, Jamie. Newman was married to Krissie, and they have two daughters.
Newman's car was featured on the cover of the 2005 EA Sports computer game NASCAR SimRacing, and he was actively involved in its development.

Newman was on an episode of American Pickers, buying bumper cars for his children.

On February 13, 2020, Newman announced that he and his wife Krissie would "amicably separate." The couple added that they will remain friends, raise their daughters together, and continue to run Rescue Ranch.

Charity
Newman and his ex-wife, Krissie, operate Rescue Ranch, whose mission is to promote, through its education, respect for all animals, as well as agricultural, environmental, and wildlife conservation; and facilitates rehabilitation, rescue, and responsible pet ownership in order to enhance the human-animal bond. The Newmans themselves have rescued and cared for five dogs: Socks, Dunkin, Fred, Jasmine, and Hollow. They are also the proud owners of an orange feline whom they named Benjamin Ries-Roncalli after the famous ex-driver. He helped fund the construction of the Catawba County, North Carolina Humane Society shelter, in the county where he once lived.

Hobbies
Newman is a car enthusiast and owns 14 cars. He enjoys driving and working on vintage cars, particularly 1950s Chryslers. His first car was a 74 Triumph TR-6. His favorite car is his 1948 Buick Roadmaster convertible he received from his wife as a birthday gift. His collection can be viewed on the History Channel show American Pickers (Episode: "Art of the Deal").

Newman also enjoys fishing when he finds time during race weekends.

Awards and honors
On April 29, 2008, the St. Joseph County, Indiana, Board of Commissioners dedicated a half-mile stretch of newly rerouted Lincoln Way West (formerly U.S. Route 20) near the South Bend Regional Airport to Newman.

Motorsports career results

NASCAR
(key) (Bold – Pole position awarded by qualifying time. Italics – Pole position earned by points standings or practice time. * – Most laps led.)

Cup Series

Daytona 500

Nationwide Series

Camping World Truck Series

 Season still in progress 
 Ineligible for series points

Whelen Modified Tour

Whelen Southern Modified Tour

ARCA Re/Max Series
(key) (Bold – Pole position awarded by qualifying time. Italics – Pole position earned by points standings or practice time. * – Most laps led.)

International Race of Champions
(key) (Bold – Pole position. * – Most laps led.)

Superstar Racing Experience
(key) * – Most laps led. 1 – Heat 1 winner. 2 – Heat 2 winner.

See also
 List of all-time NASCAR Cup Series winners
 List of NASCAR Sprint All-Star Race drivers
 List of people from Indiana
 List of Purdue University alumni

References

External links

 
 
 Ryan Newman Foundation

Living people
1977 births
Sportspeople from South Bend, Indiana
Racing drivers from Indiana
NASCAR drivers
ARCA Menards Series drivers
International Race of Champions drivers
Purdue University College of Engineering alumni
Caterpillar Inc. people
Team Penske drivers
Stewart-Haas Racing drivers
Richard Childress Racing drivers
RFK Racing drivers
USAC Silver Crown Series drivers
JR Motorsports drivers